Katarina is a Finnish training ship of the Kotka School of Nautical Studies. Built by Valmet in Helsinki in 1953 as Aranda, she was the second vessel to bear the name. Until 1989, she served as a transport vessel for the Finnish National Board of Navigation and a research vessel for the Finnish Institute of Marine Research.

Career 

In 1949, the Finnish National Board of Navigation ordered an ice-strengthened passenger ship to transport people and cargo to the islands in the Archipelago Sea. The new vessel was launched in 1951 and christened Aranda. She was the second vessel to bear the name after the previous Aranda had been handed over to the Soviet Union as war reparations after World War II. Due to these reparations, the delivery of the vessel was delayed until 1953.

While primarily built as a "winter boat" for the Archipelago Sea communities, but during the summer months she served as a research vessel for the Finnish Institute of Marine Research. During this time, she sometimes ventured outside the Baltic Sea, such as to Svalbard in 1957. In the early 1960s, she was sometimes used as a training ship for maritime schools. She was refitted twice, in 1976 and 1983.

When the third Aranda, a purpose-built research vessel for the Institute of Marine Research, was built in 1989, the old Aranda was renamed Katarina and transferred to the Kotka School of Nautical Studies to serve as a training ship.

General characteristics 

With a displacement of 1,100 tonnes, she draws  of water. Her hull is strengthened for navigation in ice according to the Finnish-Swedish ice class rules and she carries an ice class of 1A.

Built as an icegoing ship, Katarina was fitted with propellers in both stern and bow. Previously, such propulsion arrangement had been utilized in Finnish icebreakers. Her main engines, a 4-cylinder Wärtsilä 4R22HF and a 8-cylinder Wärtsilä 8R22HF medium-speed diesel generating sets, produce 590 and 1,180kW of electricity, respectively. The propulsion motors are rated 855kW (stern) and 630kW (bow). In addition, Katarina has a bow thruster and a stern thruster, both rated at 215kW.

When her engine room was rebuilt in 1983, Aranda became a testbed for a diesel-electric propulsion system utilizing cycloconverters and alternating current (AC) propulsion motors. This arrangement was then used in the 1986-built diesel-electric icebreaker Otso and later became de facto standard for large diesel-electric ships.

References 

1953 ships
Ships built in Helsinki
Research vessels of Finland